Katja Benrath (born September 1, 1979 in Erbach im Odenwald, Germany) is a German actress and filmmaker, best known for her film, Watu Wote/All of Us for which she received critical acclaim and was winner at Student Academy Award, and received an Academy Award nomination for Academy Award for Best Live Action Short Film. She also won on 2019 the Giffoni film festival in the 6+ session.

Filmography
Actress
 2005–2006: Tom Turbo (TV series), as Zara Zisch
 2006: Karo und der liebe Gott, as Polizistin
 2009: Puppenspiel (Short), as Emma
 2012: Where the Wild Roses Grow (Short), as Yasmina
 2013: Im Himmel kotzt man nicht (Short), as Karin
 2013: Ortis in Wonderland (Short), as Bad Queen
Director
 2009: Puppenspiel (Short)
 2013: Im Himmel kotzt man nicht (Short)
 2016: Wo warst du (Short)
 2016: Tilda (Short)
 2016: Schwimmstunde (Short)
 2017: Watu Wote (Short)
 2019: Rocca verändert die Welt
 2020: Life is not a kindergarten

Awards and nominations
 Nominated: Academy Award for Best Live Action Short Film
 Winner: (Gold Plaque) Student Academy Award for Best International Film School - Narrative

References

External links
 

1979 births
Living people
Film people from Hesse
German actresses
People from Erbach im Odenwald
Actors from Hesse